Yang (羊) is a Chinese surname. It is romanized Joeng in Cantonese romanization. According to a 2013 study, it was the 391st most common name in China; it was shared by 136,000 people, or 0.01% of the population, being most popular in Hainan. It is the 202nd name in the Hundred Family Surnames poem.

Origins

The surname is from the Chinese 羊 meaning "goat" or "sheep." Origins for the surname include:
from yangren (羊人) the name of an official post during the Western Zhou period (1046–771 BC) who was in charge of animal sacrifices.
A shortened form of the compound surname Yangshe (羊舌) which was originally the name of a fief (located in modern Hebei) granted to an official in the state of Jin, a great-grandson of Duke Wu of Jin (ruler of the state of Jin 716–677 BC). Some of the Yangshe clan adopted the much more common surname Yang (楊/杨).

Notable people
Yang Hu (羊祜), Jin-era general
Yang Xianrong (羊獻容), Jin and Former Han empress
Yang Huiyu (羊徽瑜), Jin empress

References

Individual Chinese surnames